Walter William Coverdale (1912-1972) was an English cricketer active from 1931 to 1932 who played for Northamptonshire (Northants). He appeared in 31 first-class matches as a righthanded batsman who bowled right arm medium pace. Coverdale was born in Romford on 30 May 1912 and died in Harlow Green, Gateshead on 6 October 1972. He scored 512 runs with a highest score of 35 not out and took one wicket with a best performance of one for 25.

Notes

1912 births
1972 deaths
English cricketers
Northamptonshire cricketers
Hertfordshire cricketers
Durham cricketers